Ryland Randolph was a newspaper publisher, Ku Klux Klan leader, and state legislator who lived in  Tuscaloosa, Alabama. He used his newspaper, the Independent Monitor, to lambast Republicans during the Reconstruction era as carpetbaggers, scalawags, and freed blacks, and attacked fellow legislator Shandy Jones and others with a cartoon of them being lynched. Jones retreated from Tuscaloosa in 1869 due to threats against him from Klansmen including Randolph and settled in Mobile. According to the first paragraph of Gladys Ward's 1932 masters thesis at the University of Alabama in Tuscaloosa, no one was truer to the white man's cause than Randolph and he was idolized by many.

Randolph won a seat in the Alabama House of Representatives after one of Tuscaloosa's two representatives in the house was murdered by the Klan. A cartoon he published of two Republican politicians being lynched from the branch of a tree was reprinted in Republican papers in Ohio to expose Democrat brutality.

The Montgomery Mail reported in May 1868 that Randolph was arrested by Federal authorities after stabbing an African American man.

In 1870, Randolph was wounded and an elderly bystander killed in a confrontation with a University of Alabama cadet reportedly over Reconstruction era politics. Randolph's leg was amputated and he eventually moved to Birmingham.

Randolph served as an editor of The Independent Monitor and was also its publisher for a time.

G. Ward Hubb wrote about the infamous lynching cartoon in his book Searching for Freedom after the Civil War: Klansman, Carpetbagger, Scalawag, and Freedman.

References

Year of birth missing
Place of birth missing
Year of death missing
Place of death missing
American Ku Klux Klan members
Members of the Alabama House of Representatives
19th-century American newspaper publishers (people)
People from Tuscaloosa, Alabama
American murderers